The 2008 Tour of Flanders cycle race was the 92nd edition of this monumental classic and took place on April 6. The course was 264 km long and went from Bruges to Meerbeke.

Pre-race favorites included Fabian Cancellara (winner of Milan–San Remo and Tirreno–Adriatico), Alessandro Ballan (defending champion), Tom Boonen (winner in 2005 and 2006) and Leif Hoste (second-place position in 2004, 2006 and 2007).

General standings
Bruges > Meerbeke, 

200 riders had started the race, just 101 riders managed to finish.

Course

The 17 Tour of Flanders hills were:

After Bosberg there was still 12 kilometers to go.

Individual 2008 UCI ProTour standings after race

See also
2008 in road cycling

External links

Race website
Race results

References

2008 in Belgian sport
2008 UCI ProTour
2008